Behzad Barkat (in ) is an Iranian University Professor of Literature and Linguistics at Guilan University, and a translator. He is the author and translator of quite a number of books and articles. He also teaches at Rasht, Azad university.
His classes are held in Persian and English, and his PhD dissertation was written and published in French.

Education
Barkat received his BA in English Literature from Kharazmi (Tarbiat Moallem) University, followed by a Master of Arts degree in General Linguistics from the University of Tehran. He was later granted a scholarship to study for his doctorate in France, at INALCO, and majored in 2004 in comparative literature/translation studies.

Works

External links 
 Dr. Behazad Barkat Gilan University
 www.ojs.unisa.edu.au
 http://www.ojs.unisa.edu.au

Iranian academics
Iranian translators
Kharazmi University alumni
Living people
University of Tehran alumni
1955 births
Academic staff of Guilin University of Technology